23 km is a rural locality (a passing loop) in Yurginskoye Rural Settlement of Yurginsky District, Russia. The population was 21 as of 2010.

Streets 
 Zheleznodorozhnaya

Geography 
23 km is located 31 km south of Yurga (the district's administrative centre) by road. Logovoy is the nearest rural locality.

References 

Rural localities in Kemerovo Oblast